Dadda'to is a village in Djibouti, located in the region of Obock.

Overview
The town lies near the border with Eritrea. Nearby towns and villages include Alaili Dadda (30 km) and Assa Gaila (38 km).

Main sights 
The village wall comprises a surface no larger than 80 m × 60 m, with a dozen houses and a mosque.

History
It is the largest settlement on the Djiboutian border with Eritrea. When France and Italy first set the boundary between Italian Eritrea and French Somaliland, Dadda'to was used as a term of reference for the latitude at which the horizontal boundary was placed. The Djibouti–Eritrea boundary has since been changed, but Dadda'to remains on the frontier.

Climate
The climate is arid desert climate in Dadda'to. Agriculture is very rare, at the time of fruits and vegetables grown in the hot, desert plants or Aloe Vera.

External links
Satellite map at Maplandia.com

Populated places in Djibouti
Obock Region
Djibouti–Eritrea border crossings